National Route 129 is a national highway of Japan connecting Hiratsuka and Sagamihara in Kanagawa Prefecture in the Kantō region of Japan. It has a total length of 31.7 km (19.7 mi).

Route description

It has junctions with National Route 16 in Sagamihara, National Routes 412 and 246 in Atsugi, Kanagawa, and National Routes 1 and 134 in Hiratsuka, Kanagawa. The route runs in a north to south direction and has junctions with some major expressways. These include, two interchanges with the Ken-Ō Expressway, Atsugi Interchange at the Tōmei Expressway and Odawara-Atsugi Road, and Atsugi-minami Interchange at the Shin-Tōmei Expressway.

History
Route 129 was originally designated on 18 May 1953 from Yokohama to Chiba as a loop around Tokyo. This was redesignated (along with a section of Route 127) as Route 16 on 1 April 1963 and the current Route 129 was designated the same day.

List of major junctions
The entire route is in Kanagawa Prefecture.

References

129
Roads in Kanagawa Prefecture